Che Kung Temple is a station on Hong Kong's . It is located on Che Kung Miu Road in Sha Tin in the New Territories. Its position was Sha Tin Tau Temporary Housing Area, so it was provisionally called "Sha Tin Tau" before the Ma On Shan line (the precursor to this section of the Tuen Ma line) opened.

It is located near the Che Kung Miu temple. On the third day of the first month in the Chinese calendar (also known as the third day of the Lunar New Year) many people use the station to get to the temple. The station is always crowded during those days.

Che Kung Temple station serves residential areas such as Chun Shek Estate, Fung Shing Court and Sha Tin Tau New Village. It also serves five schools, three churches and three temples. Although it is called "Che Kung Temple station",  is nearer to Che Kung Miu (the temple) than this station.

History 
On 21 December 2004, Che Kung Temple station opened to the public together with other KCR Ma On Shan Rail stations.

The Ma On Shan line was renamed Tuen Ma line Phase 1 at the time. Che Kung Temple station became an intermediate station on this temporary new line.

Hence, Che Kung Temple was included in the project and is now an intermediate station on the Tuen Ma line, Hong Kong's longest railway line.

Station layout

Passengers must choose the right escalator to go to the corresponding platform.

Exits
A: Hong Kong Heritage Museum 
B: Che Kung Temple 
C: Shing Mun River 
D: Sha Tin Tau 
E: The Riverpark (for residents only)
F: The Riverpark

Nearby attractions

Hong Kong Heritage Museum (Exit A)
The Hong Kong Heritage Museum can be seen on the left on a northbound Tuen Ma line train as it approaches the station. The museum itself can be reached by leaving Che Kung Temple station through Exit A and turning left and crossing the bridge over the Shing Mun River.

Che Kung Temple (Exit B)
The Che Kung Temple can be reached by exiting the station through Exit B and turning right. The temple can be seen after a short 300m walk south along Che Kung Miu Road. It should be said, though, that Che Kung Temple is actually closer to Tai Wai station than Che Kung Temple station.

References

External links
 

MTR stations in the New Territories
Ma On Shan line
Tuen Ma line
Tai Wai
Former Kowloon–Canton Railway stations
Railway stations in Hong Kong opened in 2004